Liopholidophis is a genus of harmless pseudoxyrhophiid snakes endemic to the island of Madagascar.

Species
Eight species are currently recognized.

 Liopholidophis baderi 
 Liopholidophis dimorphus 
 Liopholidophis dolicocercus 
 Liopholidophis grandidieri  – Grandidier's water snake
 Liopholidophis oligolepis 
 Liopholidophis rhadinaea 
 Liopholidophis sexlineatus  – six-lined water snake
 Liopholidophis varius 

Nota bene: A binomial authority in parentheses indicates that the species was originally described in a genus other than Liopholidophis.

References

Further reading

External links
 

Pseudoxyrhophiidae
Reptiles of Madagascar
Snake genera
Taxa named by François Mocquard